Thiago Cardoso (born 4 August 1991) is a Brazilian former footballer who played as a defender.

Career

Mineiro
He began his playing career at Clube Atlético Mineiro, making his debut in national league on 16 August 2009. He played the full match that losing to Corinthians 0–2. He played his second appearance on 2 September, replacing Wason Rentería in the 70th minute. That match Atlético lost 0–3 to Internacional. He also played the 2 matches of 2009 Copa Sudamericana.

Europe
In January 2014 he was signed by Portuguese club Beira-Mar. On 28 March 2014 his contract was terminated.

Return to Brazil
On 7 April 2014 he was signed by Rio de Janeiro club Madureira. The contract was confirmed by CBF on 25 April.

References

External links
 Globo Esporte Futpedia 
 GaloDigital encyclopedia 
 https://www.foradejogo.net/player.php?player=199108040005

1991 births
People from Juiz de Fora
Living people
Brazilian footballers
Association football central defenders
Association football defenders
Clube Atlético Mineiro players
K.V.C. Westerlo players
Brazilian expatriate footballers
Expatriate footballers in Belgium
Brazilian expatriate sportspeople in Belgium
Belgian Pro League players
Challenger Pro League players
Expatriate footballers in Portugal
Madureira Esporte Clube players
Macaé Esporte Futebol Clube players
G.D. Estoril Praia players
Primeira Liga players
S.U. Sintrense players
Sportspeople from Minas Gerais